DR 21 is a large molecular cloud located in the constellation Cygnus, discovered in 1966 as a radio continuum source by Downes and Rinehart. The region contains a high rate of star formation and is associated with the Cygnus X star forming region.

A number of different molecules have been detected in the region by their radio emission, including formaldehyde, ammonia, water and carbon monoxide.

In this region, some of the most massive stars in the Milky Way have been observed.  contains complex patterns of dust and gas, which glow in the infrared due to the presence of organic compounds known as polycyclic aromatic hydrocarbons. Jagged patterns within  result from interactions with interstellar wind, radiation pressure, magnetic fields, and gravity.

An estimated population of 2,900 stars have been formed in this molecular cloud, similar to the population of the Orion Nebula cluster, which are distributed in groups associated with cloud clumps. Feedback from the massive stars may ultimately disrupt the cloud; however, this has not happened yet due to the region's extreme youth. Study of these stars by the Spitzer Space Telescope has shown signs of protoplanetary disks.

References

External links 

 DR 21 at SIMBAD
 "Invisible Giants Exposed in New Spitzer Image" by NASA/Jet Propulsion Laboratory
 "Star Formation in the DR21 Region (B)" by NASA/Jet Propulsion Laboratory
 

Molecular clouds
Emission nebulae
Cygnus (constellation)
Star-forming regions